Enjoy the Violence is the second album by the French death/thrash metal band Massacra, released in 1991.

Reception

Track listing
  "Enjoy the Violence"   – 3:39  
  "Ultimate Antichrist"  – 3:41  
  "Gods of Hate"  – 2:56  
  "Atrocious Crimes"  – 4:01  
  "Revealing Cruelty"  – 3:32  
  "Full of Hatred"  – 5:00  
  "Seas of Blood"  – 2:05  
  "Near Death Experience"  – 4:15  
  "Sublime Extermination"  – 2:51  
  "Agonizing World"  – 3:51

Personnel
Jean-Marc Tristani - Guitars
Fred Duval - Guitars, Vocals
Pascal Jorgensen - Vocals, Bass
Chris Palengat - Drums

References

Massacra albums
1991 albums